Christophe Coppens (born 21 November 1969) is a Belgian artist and opera director, living and working in Belgium.  Trained initially as a theatre director, Coppens started his own label as an accessories designer at the age of 21, a career that would span over 20 years with several outlets, international press following and buyers the world over, and that he would combine and nurture with his first stunts and solo shows as an artist.

History 

Christophe Coppens initially studied drama at the Brussels Conservatoire/Conservatorium , and whilst pursuing a path as actor and director - quite by chance and following  an invitation to Paris from a renowned fashion magazine – developed a global career on the edge of fashion, design and art.  During the 20 years which followed, he made many collections of fashion accessories, had collaborations in the music, fashion and design world, all whilst developing his work as an artist.

Coppens created his first experimental hat collection in 1990 which was picked up from the start by international buyers and press. Through the years his activities extended to complete accessories collections for men and women and opening outlets in Antwerp, Bruges and Brussels. He would also present his collections twice a year during Paris and Japan Fashion Week. Alongside he worked on collaborations for the fashion shows of international renowned designers making hats for the likes of Issey Miyake, Guy Laroche, JuunJ and Manish Arora, and he created one of a kind presentations for high-end world class retailers Charivay (New York City), Frank et Fils (Paris) and Joyce Boutique (Hong Kong and Paris), among others. In Japan he found distribution and representation in fashion group HP France.

In addition Coppens has made accessories for pop stars such as Rihanna, Grace Jones, Scissor Sisters and Beth Ditto, and he has worked most closely with Róisín Murphy, particularly on all the costumes worn by the performer during her 2008/09 Overpowered world tour. Coppens presented his first couture accessories collection in 2006 during Paris haute couture Fashion Week, displaying spectacular theatrical skills and the surreal undertone that has become his signature style since the early beginnings. That same year HP France opened his first shop in Tokyo, and he presented his couture collection during Japan Fashion Week.

In 2010 he was named Royal Warrant Holder in Belgium, recognition that came after more than 15 years making accessories for the Belgian Royal Family. At the end of 2011, to celebrate his 20th anniversary as a milliner and artist, Coppens opened an exhibition to show and auction some of his most outstanding couture pieces and artworks, hosted by Pierre Bergé & Associates in Brussels. In early 2012, following this event, he launched a retrospective book Homework encompassing these pieces and other highlights of his career. The book was listed among The New York Times "Summer's 2012 must-reads".

2012 would also mark a very important episode in his career, when, after 21 years of making work on the edge of art and fashion Coppens decided to close his company to focus exclusively on his work as an artist. At this point his label was sold in 140 shops worldwide, his name was heard among fashion connoisseurs and he had become arguably one of the most celebrated milliners in Japan.

Coppens expressed his view on this transition in the exhibition "Everything Is Local: Landscape 1" at the prestigious Museum Boijmans Van Beuningen in Rotterdam. The show is a journey through the first six months following this violent break, how to deal with loss, letting go of the past and looking at the future.

That same year he designed the costumes for Pascal Dusapin's opera To Be Sung at De Munt, Brussels. and also designed 15 new masks for Róisín Murphy's world tour. In March 2017 Coppens returned to the theatre and directed his first opera at De Munt/La Monnaie in Brussels, Janáček's Foxie! The Cunning Little Vixen.

In 2018 he directed Bartok's Bluebeard's Castle and The Miraculous Mandarin at De Munt/La Monnaie, Norma in 2021. 
At Noord Nederlands Toneel CC directed Dorian, a new play written by Javier Barcala based on the Oscar Wilde novel "The Picture Of Dorian Gray".

From 2013 till 2017 he lived and worked in Los Angeles. From 2017 till 2019 in Madrid. In October 2019 he moved back to Belgium.

Art exhibitions

Solo shows 
2001 – The Dollhouse – Museum Charlier Brussels, Belgium
2002 – The Dollhouse II: Life Goes On – Brakke Grond Amsterdam, Netherlands
2003 – The Dollhouse III: Return to the Dollhouse – Z33 Hasselt, Belgium
2005 – Dream Your Dream – Yoyogi Stadium Tokyo, Japan
2006 – Dream Your Dream II – Gallery Joyce Paris, France
2008 – No References – Platform 21 Amsterdam, Netherlands 
2011 – Barbra – Highlight Gallery San Francisco, USA
2011 – CC 20 years – Pierre Bergé Auction House Brussels, Belgium
2013 – The Hills Are Alive : Landscape 2 – Tokyo, Japan
2013 – Everything is Local : Landscape 1 – Museum Boijmans Van Beuningen Rotterdam, Netherlands
2014 – Early Paintings HPGallery NYC, USA
2015 – Works On Paper Stephane Simoens Gallery Knokke, Belgium
2016 – 50 Masks Made In America at Please Do Not Enter Gallery Los Angeles, USA 
2016 – The Treasure at Joyce Gallery, Hongkong 
2019 – ESWC in Huis De Uil, Temse, Belgium
2021 - A Lovely Little Shitshow, Zwart Huis Gallery, Brussels, Belgium
2023 - Playdate, Zwart Huis Gallery, Brussels, Belgium

Group exhibitions 
2009 – The Art Of Fashion – Boijmans Van Beuningen Rotterdam, Netherlands
2011 – ARRRGH Monsters in Fashion – Athens, Greece
2011 – The Art Of Fashion – Wolfsburg Museum, Germany
2014 – The Future Of Fashion Is Now - Boijmans Van Beuningen Rotterdam, Netherlands
2020 - Kette und Schuss - CC De Binder Puurs, Belgium
2021 - Belgicart - Stichting Ijsberg Damme, Belgium
2021 - Look! - Marta Museum Herford, Germany
2021 - Kunstenfestival Damme, Belgium
2021 - The 10 Kids Trail - KMSKA Antwerp, Belgium

Opera 
2017 The Cunning Little Vixen|Foxie!- Leoš Janáček at De Munt/La Monnaie in Brussels
2018 Bluebeard's Castle - Béla Bartók at De Munt/La Monnaie in Brussels
2018 The Miraculous Mandarin - Béla Bartók at De Munt/La Monnaie in Brussels
2021 Norma - Vincenzo Bellini at De Munt/La Monnaie in Brussels

Books 
Home Work published by Lido 
No References published by d'jonge Hond 
Fashion and Accessories published by Artez/Terra 
Not a Toy published by Pictoplasma Berlin 
Werken met woorden published by Ludion 
Art & Fashion published by Kerber Art 
The Art of Fashion published by Bojmans Van Beuningen

References

External links 

 
 http://instagram.com/christophecoppens

Publications
Art Tube NL
https://www.hollywoodreporter.com/news/christophe-coppens-art-exhibit-features-893817
https://www.nytimes.com/2017/03/22/arts/music/a-hat-designer-for-rock-stars-turns-to-opera.html?_r=0
https://www.wsj.com/articles/where-art-and-fashion-meet-1395272585?tesla=y
https://parismatch.be/culture/scene/148281/quy-a-t-il-dans-la-tete-de-christophe-coppens-video
https://www.nrc.nl/nieuws/2018/10/01/exuberante-dorian-in-uitzinnig-decor-a2040562
https://www.trouw.nl/cultuur/-dorian-is-een-wellustige-aanklacht-tegen-kunstvermarkting~a64f51bf/
https://plus.lesoir.be/161822/article/2018-06-10/un-mandarin-trash-et-un-barbe-bleue-classe
https://www.lalibre.be/culture/scenes/foxie-transformation-reussie-par-christophe-coppens-58d0304acd705cd98e106141
https://www.current-obsession.com/the-way-of-the-future-4/
https://www.forumopera.com/foxie-la-petite-renarde-rusee-bruxelles-ne-regardez-pas-la-renarde-qui-passe
PBA Auctions
Weekend / Le Vif
Design NL
Rizzoli Bookstore

Belgian artists
Belgian fashion designers
Milliners
Belgian costume designers
Belgian opera directors
1969 births
Living people
Place of birth missing (living people)